Capcom Cup is an annual fighting game tournament specifically focused on the Street Fighter series. The event's first incarnation was in 2013 which featured Super Street Fighter IV: Arcade Edition version 2012, Ultimate Marvel vs. Capcom 3, and Street Fighter X Tekken version 2013 as the three main games each with 8 qualifiers. In 2014, Capcom Cup was an Ultra Street Fighter IV exclusive tournament with 16 qualifiers. The 2015 Capcom Cup was doubled to a 32-man format. The series of qualifying events for the tournament are known as the Capcom Pro Tour and include many of the largest, most prestigious pre-existing fighting game tournaments such as Evolution Championship Series and DreamHack.

History

2013
In 2013, Capcom started the Capcom Cup right after EVO 2013, with Ho "Xian" Kun Xian receiving a special invitation. Capcom released qualifier dates to determine the seven remaining qualifiers. Capcom created a poll to decide which players would make it into the Ultimate Marvel vs. Capcom 3 tournament, with Nemo, Justin Wong, KaneBlueRiver, IFC Yipes, Abegen, NYChrisG, Filipino Champ, and MarlinPie being voted in. For their Street Fighter X Tekken tournament, Capcom also gave special invites to Infiltration, Justin Wong, Alex Valle, and NuckleDu. The other four players were determined by two respective PlayStation Network and Xbox Live tournaments.

Capcom Cup 2013 was hosted at the Hyatt Regency San Francisco Airport in Burlingame, California on December 14, 2013. There was some controversy regarding the EVO 2013 Ultimate Marvel vs. Capcom 3 champion Job "Flocker" Figueroa being cut from the player lineup. In response, Capcom set up a First-To-Five exhibition match between EVO Champ Flocker, and the Capcom Cup 2013 champion. The victor of the Ultimate Marvel vs. Capcom 3 tournament, NYChrisG faced off against Flocker and defeated him. There was also two exhibition matches for an early build of Ultra Street Fighter IV; the first being Eduardo "PR Balrog" Perez-Frangie against Alex Valle, and the second being Infiltration vs. Filipino Champ.

2014

In 2014, Twitch and Capcom partnered up to create an Ultra Street Fighter IV circuit known as the Capcom Pro Tour. Ten players would automatically qualify into the tournament and the other six would garner points. The Capcom Pro Tour featured a point system divided into four tiers. Tier 3 consists of six Online Tournaments, which are the lowest earning tournaments in the circuit. Tier 2 is for Ranking Tournaments, which are international tournaments that are mainly composed of players in a certain region. Tier 1 consists of nine Premier Tournaments. A player would automatically qualify upon winning the tournament or being the highest player who hasn't qualified. Evolution Tier consists of the Evolution Championship Series, which grants the player four times the points of a Premier Tournament and also gives the winner an automatic spot in the Capcom Cup. Capcom has removed Tier 3 (Online Tournaments) from the 2015 Capcom Pro Tour circuit.

Capcom Cup 2014 was the conclusion of the Capcom Pro Tour in 2014. Capcom Cup 2014 was held at The Warfield in San Francisco, California on December 13, 2014. One notable appearance in the Capcom Cup was a Brazilian player named Eric "ChuChu" Moreira Silva, who qualified by garnering majority of his points from the online tournaments. Another notable moment was Momochi's dominant performance; taking a set off of Snake Eyez, losing a set to Ryan Hart, then completely dominated everyone in the tournament. There were also two exhibition matches for the Ultra Street Fighter IV Omega Mode, a mode which changes how every character plays. The main exhibition was Alex Valle vs. Ryan "Filipino Champ" Ramirez, and the secondary exhibition was Kelvin Jeon going up against Hooman "Hoodaman" Ghahremani. Capcom also showed the first ever match of their upcoming game Street Fighter V with Twitch's Mike Ross using Ryu going up against Capcom's Peter "Combofiend" Rosas using Chun-Li.

2015

Capcom Cup 2015 was announced by Yoshinori Ono at Capcom Cup 2014. The tournament will use the same ruleset as the previous year. Capcom Pro Tour 2015 has a total pot bonus of $500,000 thanks to a partnership between Sony Computer Entertainment and Capcom. The tournament has also been doubled from 16 qualifiers to 32. One of the spots was reserved for 2014's Capcom Cup champion, Yusuke Momochi. In May, Capcom announced a new rule for the Capcom Pro Tour Premier events, stating that if the Top 4 players in a Capcom Pro Tour premier event have all qualified, Capcom will remove the automatic qualifying spot and add a new qualifying slot to the CPT Leaderboards.

Capcom Cup 2015 was held December 6 at Moscone Center in San Francisco, California, coinciding with the PlayStation Experience conference.

2016

Capcom Cup 2016 is to be held in December 2016. 32 players will qualify for the tournament by winning one of the eleven Capcom Pro Tour Global Premier Events, Evo 2016, one of the four regional events, or by scoring high on the Points Leaderboards. Street Fighter V was released shortly before the start of the 2016 Capcom Pro Tour and has replaced Ultra Street Fighter IV during this season.

Capcom Cup 2016 was held over December 2 and 3 of that year. The top 32 to top 8 portion of the tournament was held on December 2 at the esports Arena in Santa Ana, California, while the top 8 portion was held on December 3 at that year's PlayStation Experience at the Anaheim Convention Center in Anaheim, California. The tournament was eventually won by NuckleDu, defeating Ricki Ortiz in the finale.

2017

Capcom moved away from auto-qualification spots in the 2017 Capcom Pro Tour. This was done to simplify the Pro Tour, as confusion arose around the Global and Regional Leaderboards throughout the 2016 season. Capcom's Neidel "Haunts" Crisan also noted in November 2016 that the 2017 Pro Tour may host fewer events than the 2016 season.

2018

The 2018 Capcom Cup was held in the Esports Arena in Las Vegas on December 14–16. The tournament began with a "Last Chance Qualifier" event, which filled the final spot of the 32-person Capcom Cup bracket. The tournament's first prize was set to $250,000 USD. Capcom Cup 2018 was won by Kanamori "Gachikun" Tsunehiro, defeating Hiromiki "Itabashi Zangief" Kumada in the grand finals. No. 1 seed and Evo 2017 champion Taniguchi "Tokido" Hajime dropped out early during the tournament, alongside various other high-seeded players.

References

External links
Capcom Cup website
Capcom Pro Tour website
Capcom Fighters Twitch Channel

 
Recurring events established in 2013
2013 establishments in California
Events in the San Francisco Bay Area